Babatu is a 1976 Nigerien film directed by Jean Rouch. It was an official selection in the 1976 Cannes Film Festival.

Cast
 Lam Dia
 Diama
 Oumarou Ganda
 Mariama
 Talou
 Damouré Zika

References

External links

1976 films
Nigerien drama films
1970s French-language films
Films directed by Jean Rouch